Warsaw School of Mathematics is the name given to a group of mathematicians who worked at Warsaw, Poland, in the two decades between the World Wars, especially in the fields of logic, set theory, point-set topology and real analysis. They published in the journal Fundamenta Mathematicae, founded in 1920—one of the world's first specialist pure-mathematics journals. It was in this journal, in 1933, that Alfred Tarski—whose illustrious career would a few years later take him to the University of California, Berkeley—published his celebrated theorem on the undefinability of the notion of truth.

Notable members of the Warsaw School of Mathematics have included:
 Wacław Sierpiński
 Kazimierz Kuratowski
 Edward Marczewski
 Bronisław Knaster
 Zygmunt Janiszewski
 Stefan Mazurkiewicz
 Stanisław Saks
 Karol Borsuk
 Roman Sikorski
 Nachman Aronszajn
 Samuel Eilenberg

Additionally, notable logicians of the Lwów–Warsaw School of Logic, working at Warsaw, have included:
 Stanisław Leśniewski
 Adolf Lindenbaum
 Alfred Tarski
 Jan Łukasiewicz
 Andrzej Mostowski
 Helena Rasiowa

Fourier analysis has been advanced at Warsaw by:
 Aleksander Rajchman
 Antoni Zygmund
 Józef Marcinkiewicz
 Otton M. Nikodym
 Jerzy Spława-Neyman

See also
 Polish School of Mathematics
 Kraków School of Mathematics
 Lwów School of Mathematics

Polish mathematics
History of education in Poland
History of mathematics
History of Warsaw
Science and technology in Poland
Warsaw School of Mathematics